Vladimir Grushikin (born 11 June 1971 in Moscow, Russian SSR) is an Armenian-Russian sprint canoeist who competed for Armenia in the early 2000s before competing for Russia in the mid-2000s. He won a bronze medal in the K-4 500 m at the 2003 ICF Canoe Sprint World Championships in Gainesville for Russia.

Grushikhin also competed in two Summer Olympics. At the 2000 Summer Olympics in Sydney competing for Armenia, he was eliminated in the semifinals of the K-1 1000 m event while being disqualified in the semifinals of the K-1 500 m event. Four years later in Athens, competing for Russia, Gurshikhin was eliminated in the semifinals of the K-2 1000 m event while finishing ninth in the K-2 500 m event.

References

External links

Sports-Reference.com

1971 births
Living people
Armenian male canoeists
Russian male canoeists
Olympic canoeists of Armenia
Olympic canoeists of Russia
Canoeists at the 2000 Summer Olympics
Canoeists at the 2004 Summer Olympics
ICF Canoe Sprint World Championships medalists in kayak
Armenian people of Russian descent